Xove is a municipality of Galicia, Spain in the province of Lugo.

Geography 

Punta Roncadoira (Roncadoira Point) is the location of the Punta Roncadoira Lighthouse on the Atlantic coast within the Cove municipality.

References

External links 
  Ferrol-San Cibrao Port Authority

 Municipalities in the Province of Lugo